Rodrigo José dos santos  (born 21 January 1981) is a Brazilian footballer. He is currently under contract for Italian Serie A side Chievo.

Biography
Born in Brazil, Rodrigo Thiago started his professional career at Italy after scouted by Chievo. He made his first team debut for Chievo on 8 November 2006, a Coppa Italia Round of 16 first leg against Reggina, a 2–2 draw. He substituted Salvatore Bruno after Paolo Sammarco scored the equalizing goal. He played the next 2 games on 10 January and 17 January 2007, the quarter-final matches of the cup against Sampdoria.

In 2008–09 season he was loaned to Mezzocorona and in January 2009 to Itala San Marco.

In 2009–10 season, along with Stefano Olivieri they failed to loan out and were not assigned a shirt number.

References

External links
 Profile at Chievo 

Brazilian footballers
Brazilian expatriate footballers
A.C. ChievoVerona players
Association football forwards
Footballers from São Paulo
1988 births
Living people